Yale is an unincorporated community in Cowlitz County, Washington, northeast of the city of Woodland. The rock-fill hydro-electric Yale Dam is nearby. Named for Yale University, the only school teaching forestry in the 19th century, the Yale community is part of the Woodland School District, a K-12 school district of about 2,200 students.

The eruption of Mount St. Helens on May 18, 1980 was the deadliest and most economically destructive volcanic event in the history of the United States. For many years climbers attempting to scale Mount St. Helens registered at Jack's Store until it burned down in December 2007. Yale has several view locations for Mount St. Helens.

Geography
Yale is located at  (45.9953885, -122.3800979).

External links
Woodland Public Schools website

References

Unincorporated communities in Cowlitz County, Washington
Unincorporated communities in Washington (state)